In computational complexity theory, a generalized game is a game or puzzle that has been generalized so that it can be played on a board or grid of any size. For example, generalized chess is the game of chess played on an  board, with  pieces on each side. Generalized Sudoku includes Sudokus constructed on an  grid.

Complexity theory studies the asymptotic difficulty of problems, so generalizations of games are needed, as games on a fixed size of board are finite problems.

For many generalized games which last for a number of moves polynomial in the size of the board, the problem of determining if there is a win for the first player in a given position is PSPACE-complete. Generalized hex and reversi are PSPACE-complete.

For many generalized games which may last for a number of moves exponential in the size of the board, the problem of determining if there is a win for the first player in a given position is EXPTIME-complete. Generalized chess, go (with Japanese ko rules), Quixo, and checkers are EXPTIME-complete.

See also
Game complexity
Combinatorial game theory

References

Computational complexity theory
Combinatorial game theory